SindoPower is the first business-to-business (B2B) eCommerce business owned by a manufacturer of power semiconductor components. Other manufacturers rely on representatives or independent distributors.

SindoPower's parent company, The German-based holding company Semikron, employs 3,600 people worldwide. SEMIKRON comprises a global network of 35 companies with 10 production sites. Power electronics are produced in Germany, France, Italy, Slovakia, South Africa, Brazil, USA, China, India and South Korea. The company  has a 37% share of the worldwide market for diode/thyristor modules.

SindoPower was integrated into the Semikron Group in 2015.

Products 
SindoPower’s product range consists of approximately 2,000 of overall 11,600 different power semiconductors from 1 kW to 10 MW, including chips, discrete diodes/thyristors, fuses, sensors, varistors, connectors, and power modules (IGBT, MOSFET, diode, thyristor) as an official distributor of Epcos, LEM, Mersen, SEMIKRON and Weidmüller.

eCommerce 
In a market dominated by traditional sales channels, SindoPower's eCommerce model has features atypical for power semiconductor B2B's:
 public transparency in pricing
 Web 2.0 community approach for power electronics experts
 real-time customer service
 stock visibility and automatic substitute proposal for out of stock components

Customer care 
In May 2012 Epcos, Mersen, Proton-Electrotex, Semikron, SindoPower and Weidmüller started the joined platform PowerGuru to centralize power electronics know-how at one place.

Location 
Customers all over the world except from mainland China are handled by SindoPower GmbH. Customers from mainland China are handled by Zhuhai SindoPower Electronics Company Ltd.

Literature

Sources

External links 
 

Electronics companies of Germany
Companies based in Nuremberg